Studies in the History of Medieval Religion is a history book series published by Boydell & Brewer on the history of medieval religion. The series editor is Frances Andrews of St Andrews University. As of November 2016 there were 44 volumes in print in the series.

See also
Medieval World Series
Routledge Studies in Medieval Religion and Culture

References 

Series of history books
History books about religion
Religion in the Middle Ages